Luyindula Rickson Mansiamina (born 9 July 1997 in Bredäng, Stockholm) is an unattached Swedish footballer who plays as a midfielder.

Career
He played for three Stockholm clubs in his youth; Enskede IK, Bagarmossen Kärrtorp BK and Hammarby IF, before joining AIK's youth academy in 2011. In 2016, he went on loan to IFK Helsingfors and played nine league games in the Veikkausliiga.

In August 2019, Mansiamina joined IFK Haninge.

References

External links
 
 

1997 births
Living people
Swedish footballers
Swedish expatriate footballers
Allsvenskan players
Superettan players
Veikkausliiga players
AIK Fotboll players
HIFK Fotboll players
GAIS players
Syrianska FC players
Enskede IK players
Association football midfielders
Swedish expatriate sportspeople in Finland
Expatriate footballers in Finland
Footballers from Stockholm